A. amphibius may refer to:
 Arvicola amphibius, a species of mammal
 Andamia amphibius, a species of fish